Ordoñezite or ordóñezite is a rare tetragonal zinc antimonate mineral with chemical formula: ZnSb2O6.

Discovery
Ordóñezite was first discovered and documented by Ezequiel Ordóñez (1867-1950), a Mexican geologist, formerly director of the Geological Institute of Mexico. 
It was first described in 1953 for an occurrence with cassiterite in veins in rhyolite in the Santín mine which is located about eight kilometres from Santa Catarina, Guanajuato, Mexico.

Properties
Optical properties include: semitransparent, very light to very dark colorless to pearl-gray, light yellowish olive to dark olive.

References

External links
 Santin mine

Zinc minerals
Antimony minerals
Tetragonal minerals
Minerals in space group 136
Oxide minerals
Minerals described in 1953